Alison Munt (born 21 October 1965) is an Australian professional golfer. She played on the Ladies European Tour as well as on the ALPG Tour in her home country.

Munt won three times on the Ladies European Tour between 2000 and 2003, the last time aged 37, after beating Elisabeth Esterl in a playoff in Portugal. 

She finished third at the 2000 TSN Ladies World Cup Golf in partnership with Jane Crafter.

Professional wins (5)

Ladies European Tour wins (3)

Ladies European Tour playoff record (1–0)

ALPG Tour wins (2)
1988 LPGAA Championship
2001 Aristoocrat Mollymook Women's Classic

Source:

Team appearances
Amateur
Commonwealth Trophy (representing Australia): 1987
Tasman Cup (representing Australia): 1987 (tied)

Professional
TSN Ladies World Cup Golf (representing Australia): 2000

References

External links

Australian female golfers
ALPG Tour golfers
Ladies European Tour golfers
1965 births
Living people